A meander is a bend in a river.

Meander may also refer to:

Geography

Municipalities or communities
 Meander, Mississippi, former name of Gholson, an unincorporated community in Noxubee County, Mississippi, U.S.
 Meander, Tasmania, a rural town in Meander Valley Council, Tasmania, Australia
 Meander Valley Council, a rural local government area in Tasmania, Australia

Geographical features
 Meander Dam, a concrete gravity dam across the Upper Meander River, Tasmania, Australia
 Meander Glacier, a large meandering tributary to Mariner Glacier in Victoria Land, Antarctica
 Meander River (disambiguation), several rivers that share the name
 Meander River (Tasmania), Australia

Arts, entertainment, and media 
 Meander (album), 1995 album by the band Carbon Leaf
 Meander (art), a decorative border constructed from a continuous line, shaped into a repeated motif
 Meander (film), a 2020 French science fiction film

Ships
 Meander (1855), a passenger steamship built for James Moss & Co. of Liverpool
 , the name of two ships of the Royal Navy

Other uses
 Meander (mathematics), a self-avoiding closed curve which intersects a line a number of times
 Meander (mythology), a river god in Greek mythology and patron of the Maeander River in Turkey
 Meander Prepona (Archaeoprepona meander), a butterfly in the family Nymphalida

See also
 Wandering (disambiguation)